Chikiti is a Vidhan Sabha constituency of Ganjam district, Odisha.

This constituency includes Chikiti N.A.C., Chikiti Block and Patrapur Block.

Elected Members

Twelve elections were held between 1967 and 2014.
Elected members from the Chikiti constituency are:
2014: (135): Usha Devi (BJD) 
2009: (135): Usha Devi (BJD)
2004: (76): Usha Devi (BJD)
2000: (76): Usha Devi (BJD)
1995: (76): Chintamani Dyan Samantara (Independent) 
1990: (76): Usha Devi (Janata Dal)
1985: (76): Chintamani Dyan Samantara (Congress)
1980: (76): Chintamani Dyan Samantara (Independent)
1977: (76): Jagannath Pati (Janata Party)
1974: (76): Sachhidanand Narayan Deb (Congress)
1971: (72): Sachhidanand Narayan Deb (Orissa Jana Congress)
1967: (72): Dibakar Patanik (Congress)

2019 Election Result

2014 Election Result
In 2014 election,  Biju Janata Dal candidate Usha Devi defeated  Indian National Congress candidate Mano Ranjan Dyana Samantara by a margin of 32,148 votes.

Summary of results of the 2009 Election
In 2009 election, Biju Janata Dal candidate Usha Devi defeated Indian National Congress candidate Chintamani Dyan Samantara by a margin of 14,229 votes.

Notes

References

Assembly constituencies of Odisha
Politics of Ganjam district